Manuel Alonso Martínez (1827, Burgos – 1891, Madrid) was a Spanish jurist and politician, and the principal redactor of the Spanish Civil Code.

After working as a Burgos attorney, he entered public service in 1854 as a member of the Cortes. During his political career, he served as Minister of Development, of Finance, of Grace and Justice, as governor of Madrid and as the 139th president of the Congress of Deputies. He was instrumental in pursuing the codification of Spanish civil law.

His widow, Doña Demetria Martín y Baraya, received in 1891 the title of Marchioness of Alonso Martínez.

References
 

1827 births
1891 deaths
People from Burgos
Progressive Party (Spain) politicians
Liberal Union (Spain) politicians
Liberal Party (Spain, 1880) politicians
Economy and finance ministers of Spain
Government ministers of Spain
Justice ministers of Spain
Presidents of the Congress of Deputies (Spain)
Members of the Congress of Deputies (Spain)
Members of the Congress of Deputies of the Spanish Restoration
Politicians from Castile and León
Spanish jurists
Government ministers during the First Spanish Republic